Assault to the Sky is a 2016 Italian documentary film written and  directed by Francesco Munzi. It premiered out of competition at the 73rd edition of the Venice Film Festival. It depicts, through archive footage from Istituto Luce, the activities and the aftermath of the 1968 movement in Italy.

References

External links  

2016 documentary films
Italian documentary films
Documentary films about Italy
1968 protests
2010s Italian films